Stathis Chatzilampros (born 24 June 1997) is a Greek professional footballer who plays as a right-back.

References

1997 births
Living people
Greek footballers
Super League Greece players
Gamma Ethniki players
Super League Greece 2 players
Levadiakos F.C. players
Association football defenders
Footballers from Thebes, Greece